God's Seat is a popular vista and rock formation in Malibu, California, United States, about two miles east of Circle X Ranch in the Santa Monica Mountains National Recreation Area. God's Seat's name derives from its natural throne-like shape at the top of a thousand-foot cliff. It is well-known locally for its scenic views of Lake Sherwood, Sandstone Peak, the Conejo Valley and the Pacific Ocean.

The formation is visible from Yerba Buena Road, about two miles north of Mulholland Highway along the Backbone Trail. The California Hells Angels were supposedly once common fixtures at the site, which they nicknamed Smoker's Perch. The "seat of the throne" today is a floor of broken glass, though the site is now patrolled daily so as to prevent further vandalism.

See also

Santa Monica Mountains
Santa Monica Mountains National Recreation Area
Mulholland Highway
Sandstone Peak

References

External links
Google Maps

 The coordinates are 34°06'36.2"N -118°54'23.8"W

Santa Monica Mountains
Malibu, California
Landforms of Ventura County, California
Tourist attractions in Malibu, California